Pablo Ndong Esi (1969 – 15 December 2010), better known as Boyas, was an Equatoguinean football goalkeeper and manager.

The stadium located in Sampaka, a town between Luba and Malabo, is called "Estadio Pablo Boyas" as a posthumous honor.

International career
Boyas was with the Equatoguinean senior team in 2002, when he participated of an Africa Cup of Nations 2004 Qualifying match against Sierra Leone on 8 September. In turn, he was substitute in an Africa Cup of Nations 2008 Qualifying match against Cameroon on 7 October 2006.

Boyas also had B matches in 1999, playing the UNIFAC Cup.

Death
Boyas was killed, alongside the Equatoguinean women's international footballer Téclaire Bille and her eldest brother on 15 December 2010, in a road accident between Yaounde and Douala in Cameroon. He was the head coach of Deportivo Mongomo.

References

1969 births
2010 deaths
Equatoguinean footballers
Equatorial Guinea international footballers
Association football goalkeepers
Equatoguinean football managers
Road incident deaths in Cameroon